Shyam Laha (26 November 1911 – 25 October 1973) was an Indian actor in Bengali and Hindi-language films. He was known for his comic acting.

Early life
Shyam Laha was born in 1911 in Kolkata, British India. His original name was Kashinath Shil. Laha passed matriculation from Bangabashi Collegiate School. He was interested in music, playing the Tabla.

Career
Actor Pahari Sanyal was impressed by Laha at a function of the Bengali club in Lucknow and introduced him to Bengali director cum actor Pramathesh Barua. Laha became popular after acting in Debaki Bose's film Chandidas. He acted in the first animated Bengali film Pear Brothers in 1934. Music director Rai Chand Boral formed his independent MLB production company with Laha. He also appeared in theatres as well as being a radio comic. Laha performed in a comedy duo with another comedian Nabadwip Haldar in various films as a Bengali version of Laurel and Hardy.

Filmography
 Pear Brothers
 Bhagya Chakra
 Dhoop Chhaon
 Pujarin
 Dharti Mata 
 Sapera
 Bagha Jatin
 Zindagi
 Milan
 Dampati
 Sahadharmini
 Marutirtha Hinglaj
 Ekti Raat
 Manikjore
 Samadhan
 Kalo Chhaya
 Noukadubi
 Neelachaley Mahaprabhu 
 Niruddesh 
 Saat Number Kayedi
 Hanabari
 Uttar Falguni
 Indrani
 Lakh Taka
 Bhanu Goenda Jahar Assistant
 Basanta Bilap
 Deya Neya
 Sharey Chuattar
 Jamalaye Jibanta Manush
 Antony Firingee
 Shriman Prithviraj

References

External links
 

1911 births
1973 deaths
Male actors in Bengali cinema
Indian stand-up comedians
Indian male radio actors
People from West Bengal
Male actors from Kolkata
20th-century Indian male actors
20th-century comedians